Yoshimura Chōgi may refer to:

Yoshimura Chōgi (prince)
Yoshimura Chōgi (karate master)